Tucker County High School is a high school located in Hambleton, West Virginia, with approximately 300 students. It is located at 116 Mountain Lion Way, and serves all of Tucker County. The current principal is Alex Cork. 

The school's mission is to "...be the best high school in the state of West Virginia both academically and athletically. We believe that our students, staff, and community have the potential to be the gold standard in West Virginia public education".

References

External links
 official website
 US News Best High Schools: Tucker County High School

Public high schools in West Virginia
Schools in Tucker County, West Virginia